"The Knoxville Girl" is an Appalachian murder ballad.

Origins
This ballad was collected by Samuel Pepys, who wrote about the murder of Anne Nichols by the Mill's apprentice Francis Cooper. Other versions are known as the "Waxweed Girl", "The Wexford Murder". These are in turn derived from an Elizabethan era poem or broadside ballad, "The Cruel Miller".

Possibly modelled on the 17th-century broadside William Grismond's Downfall, or A Lamentable Murther by him Committed at Lainterdine in the county of Hereford on March 12, 1650: Together with his lamentation., sometimes known as The Bloody Miller.

Lyrics
I met a little girl in Knoxville, a town we all know well
And every Sunday evening, out in her home, I'd dwell
We went to take an evening walk about a mile from town
I picked a stick up off the ground and knocked that fair girl down

She fell down on her bended knees, for mercy she did cry
"Oh Willy dear, don't kill me here, I'm unprepared to die"
She never spoke another word, I only beat her more
Until the ground around me within her blood did flow

I took her by her golden curls and I drug her round and around
Throwing her into the river that flows through Knoxville town
Go down, go down, you Knoxville girl with the dark and rolling eyes
Go down, go down, you Knoxville girl, you can never be my bride

I started back to Knoxville, got there about midnight
My mother, she was worried and woke up in a fright
Saying "dear son, what have you done to bloody your clothes so?"
I told my anxious mother I was bleeding at my nose

I called for me a candle to light myself to bed
I called for me a handkerchief to bind my aching head
Rolled and tumbled the whole night through, as troubles was for me
Like flames of hell around my bed and in my eyes could see

They carried me down to Knoxville and put me in a cell
My friends all tried to get me out but none could go my bail
I'm here to waste my life away down in this dirty old jail
Because I murdered that Knoxville girl, the girl I loved so well

Recordings

Samples
 Plan B in the bootleg mash-up "Paint It Blacker" (2007) as a reference to violent music existing before modern rap.

Parodies
 Patrick Sky on his album Songs That Made America Famous, as "Yonkers Girl".
 GG Allin on his album Carnival of Excess, as "Watch Me Kill".

Uses in other media
The song features prominently in If Ever I Return, Pretty Peggy-O, the first book in the Ballad mystery series by Sharyn McCrumb.

Bibliography
 Collin Escott. Roadkill on the Three-chord Highway: Art and Trash in American Popular Music. New York: Routledge, 2002.

References

External links
 Essay on the historical roots of "knoxville Girl."
 

Murder ballads
Child Ballads
Outlaws (band) songs
The Louvin Brothers songs
The Wilburn Brothers songs
19th-century songs
Year of song unknown
Songwriter unknown